Kildevæld Church (Danish: Kildevældskirken) is a Lutheran church in the Østerbro district of Copenhagen, Denmark. It belongs to the church of Denmark. Completed in 1932, it is one of many churches in Copenhagen which was built by the Church Foundation.

History
 
In the beginning of the 1920s, Zion's Parish had developed into the second most populous parish in Copenhagen. A committee was therefore set up and the Copenhagen Church Foundation was Church Foundation undertook the task to raise the necessary funds. A competition for the design of the new church was won by Paul Staffeldt Matthiesen who later also designed several more churches for the Church Foundation, including Højdevang Church and Simon Peter's Church on Amager. The foundation stone was set on 29 January 29 January 1930 and the church was consecrated on 2 October 1932.

Architecture
The church is designed in a Neo-Gothic style which draws on inspiration both from medieval Danish abbey churches and village churches of provincial Zealand. The nostalgic style was in stark contrast to the Modernism which otherwise dominated Danish architecture at the time. The cross-vaulted interior is white-washed. The crypt has a separate entrance and is used for social activities among members of the parish.

Furnishings
The altarpiece was painted by Oscar Matthiesen, the architect's father, who has also painted the Constituent Assembly in Rigsdagen's  assembly  hall in Christiansborg. It depicts Jesus With a Samaritan Woman (John ev. IV, 1-42). The pulpit is carved in wood and shows three scenes from the Acts of the Apostles. On the wall next to the pulpit is a copy of Jens Adolf Jerichau's crucifix which is also found in St. Paul's Church at Nyboder and outside Jesus Church in Valby as well as in many village churches. The original is carved in marble and found in the Ny Carlsberg Glyptotek.

References

External links

 Official website

Lutheran churches in Copenhagen
20th-century Church of Denmark churches
Churches completed in 1932
Churches in the Diocese of Copenhagen